The 1990–91 season saw Olympique de Marseille compete in the French Division 1 as reigning champions as well as the 1990–91 Coupe de France and the 1990–91 European Cup.

Season summary
Two-time league winning manager Gérard Gili began the season in charge but was sacked in September and replaced by Bayern Munich legend and World Cup winner Franz Beckenbauer. Beckenbauer himself would be replaced mid-way through the season after a run of mixed results by Belgian manager Raymond Goethals, joining from Division 1 rivals Bordeaux.

Marseille would win their third straight league title and reached the final of both the Coupe de France and European Cup, making their first ever appearance in the final of the latter competition. Marseille lost both finals, to AS Monaco in the domestic cup, and in penalties to Red Star Belgrade in the European Cup.

Overall record

Competitions

Division 1

League table

Results summary

Results by round

Coupe de France

European Cup

First round

Second round

Quarter-final

Semi-final

Final

Notes

References

Olympique de Marseille seasons
French football championship-winning seasons